Lennox is an unincorporated community located in the town of Schoepke, Oneida County, Wisconsin, United States. Lennox is located just north of the unincorporated community of Jennings, Wisconsin. The community is named after Lenox, Massachusetts, which took its name from Charles Lennox, 1st Duke of Richmond.

References

Unincorporated communities in Oneida County, Wisconsin
Unincorporated communities in Wisconsin